Hibbertia oligantha is a species of flowering plant in the family Dilleniaceae and is endemic to the south-west of Western Australia. It is a shrub with linear leaves and yellow flowers with six to ten stamens on one side of two glabrous carpels.

Description
There are six to ten stamens fused at the base and arranged on one side of the two glabrous carpels that each contain two ovules. Flowering mostly occurs from September to November.

Taxonomy
Hibbertia oligantha was first formally described in 2004 by Judith R. Wheeler in the journal Nuytsia from specimens collected near Scaddan in 1984. The specific epithet (oligantha) means "few-flowered".

Distribution and habitat
This hibbertia grows in heath in sandy soil between Peak Charles, Ravensthorpe and Esperance in the Esperance Plains and Mallee biogeographic regions of south-western Western Australia.

Conservation status
Hibbertia oligantha is classified as "not threatened" by the Western Australian Government Department of Parks and Wildlife.

See also
List of Hibbertia species

References

oligantha
Flora of Western Australia
Plants described in 2004